Csaba Dosa (born 31 January 1951) is a Romanian athlete. He competed in the men's high jump at the 1968 Summer Olympics.

References

1951 births
Living people
Athletes (track and field) at the 1968 Summer Olympics
Romanian male high jumpers
Olympic athletes of Romania
Place of birth missing (living people)
Universiade bronze medalists for Romania
Universiade medalists in athletics (track and field)
Medalists at the 1973 Summer Universiade